Kimberly "Kim" Severson  (born August 22, 1973, in Tucson, Arizona) is a highly successful international equestrian. She took several years of dressage lessons before training in eventing, and began with a background in Pony Club. One of her first upper level event horses was Jerry McGerry, whom she took intermediate.

Her most well known mount is the English Thoroughbred gelding Winsome Andante (aka "Dan") owned by Linda Wachtmeister and Plain Dealing Farm. The pair won the Rolex Kentucky Three Day three times, an unmatched feat. Dan was retired in a ceremony at Rolex in 2008.

She currently lives in Keene, Virginia.

Awards
 1999 Rolex Kentucky CCI*** First Place with Over the Limit
 USEA's Lady Rider of the Year 2001, 2002, 2004, 2005
 2002 World Equestrian Games in Jerez, Spain Team Gold with Winsome Adante
 2002 Rolex Kentucky CCI**** First Place with Winsome Adante
 2004 Rolex Kentucky CCI**** First Place (full format with steeplechase) with Winsome Adante
 2004 Athens Olympics Individual Silver Medal and Team Bronze with Winsome Adante
 2005 Rolex Kentucky CCI**** First Place with Winsome Adante
 2006 FEI World Equestrian Games 17th Individually with Winsome Adante - Team finished 4th
 2007 The Fork CICW-*** First Place with Winsome Adante
 2007 Badminton CCI**** Third Place with Winsome Adante

CCI5* results

References

1973 births
Living people
Equestrians at the 2004 Summer Olympics
Sportspeople from Tucson, Arizona
American event riders
American female equestrians
Medalists at the 2004 Summer Olympics
Olympic silver medalists for the United States in equestrian
Olympic bronze medalists for the United States in equestrian
21st-century American women